Myanmar–Spain relations are the bilateral and diplomatic relations between these two countries. Myanmar is accredited to Spain from its embassy in Paris, France. Spain has an embassy in Yangon.

Diplomatic relations 
Diplomatic relations have improved in recent years after the opening of the Burmese regime. In March 2012, the Director General of Asia visited Myanmar.

Business relations 
Trade relations between Spain and Myanmar are reduced and deeply unbalanced in favor of Myanmar. The reason is a constant growth of imports during the last years (since 2009, imports from Myanmar grew to 36 million euros, but with a minimum decrease in the last biennium). On the other hand, exports have also increased considerably, 69%, but from insignificant figures, €3.4 million.

Investments 
The flows of Spanish investment in Myanmar are non-existent, with a zero stock in M € as of December 31, 2013. According to the figures from the Foreign Investment Registry, the gross Spanish direct investment flows in Myanmar are deficient.

The Burmese market penetration is very low by Spanish companies, although growing. The number of Spanish companies in the chemical, electronic and clothing sector that manufacture or buy in Myanmar has increased significantly, which explains the large trade deficit.

Cooperation 
Cooperation relations are framed within the EU which has become one of the largest donors in Myanmar with a budget that
rubs the 180 M €. The goal is to help Myanmar meet the Millennium Goals, develop civil society and move forward with the reform process.

For the period 2014–2020, European aid will be increased. For that, good coordination between the EU, its member states and the
Burmese Government That was the objective of the I and II Development Cooperation Forum held in Myanmar in January 2013 and 2014 that set the challenges of European cooperation in Myanmar for the coming years.

As agreed in the Forum, the main fields of action for European cooperation will be: the consolidation of peace, governance, rural development, health, education, and private sector development. The horizontal priorities will be: Human rights, civil society, gender and the environment.

See also 
 Foreign relations of Myanmar
 Foreign relations of Spain

References 

 
Spain
Myanmar